The U.S. Naval Station in Key West, Florida, United States is a historic district that was listed on the National Register of Historic Places in 1984.

It is a  district roughly bounded by Whitehead, Eaton, and Caroline Streets.  It included 23 structures built during 1845–1923, one built in 1942, four fresh water cisterns and four elevated storage tanks.

The Naval Station included an area known as the Truman Annex, an area including officer's quarters and the "Little White House" where President Harry S Truman occasionally vacationed.

Gallery

References

External links
 Florida's Office of Cultural and Historical Programs
 Monroe County listings
 US Naval Air Station

History of Key West, Florida
Landmarks in Key West, Florida
National Register of Historic Places in Key West, Florida
Neoclassical architecture in Florida